Andinoacara is a genus of fish in the family Cichlidae. The genus was described in 2009. Before this the members of Andinoacara were placed in the "catch-all" genus Aequidens although they are not closely related to the other members of this genus. The genus Andinoacara is restricted to freshwater habitats in northwestern South America (Trinidad and the Orinoco Basin west to the Pacific coast of South America as far south as Peru) and southern Central America (Costa Rica and Panama). There are no members of the genus in the Amazon Basin.

Species
There are currently eight recognized species in this genus:

 Andinoacara biseriatus (Regan, 1913)
 Andinoacara blombergi Wijkmark, S. O. Kullander & Barriga S., 2012
 Andinoacara coeruleopunctatus (Kner, 1863)
 Andinoacara latifrons (Steindachner, 1878) (Platinum acara)
 Andinoacara pulcher (Gill, 1858) (Blue acara)
 Andinoacara rivulatus (Gunther, 1860) (Green terror)
 Andinoacara sapayensis (Regan, 1903) (Sapayo cichlid)
 Andinoacara stalsbergi Musilová, I. Schindler & Staeck, 2009

References 

 
Cichlasomatini
Freshwater fish genera
Cichlid genera